Gypenosides are triterpenoid saponins and are the main active components of Gynostemma pentaphyllum, a climbing plant in the family Cucurbitaceae. They have been traditionally used in herbal medicine and have been shown to be effective in the treatment of cardiovascular diseases, although their mechanism of action is unknown.

Gypenoside A has the chemical formula C46H74O17.

References

Saponins